Fischer random chess, also known as Chess960 ('chess nine-sixty'), is a variation of the game of chess invented by the former world chess champion Bobby Fischer. Fischer announced this variation on June 19, 1996, in Buenos Aires, Argentina. Fischer random chess employs the same board and pieces as classical chess, but the starting position of the pieces on the players'  is randomized, following certain rules. The random setup makes gaining an advantage through the memorization of openings impracticable; players instead must rely more on their skill and creativity .

Randomizing the main pieces had long been known as shuffle chess, but Fischer random chess introduces new rules for the initial random setup, "preserving the dynamic nature of the game by retaining  for each player and the right to castle for both sides". The result is 960 unique possible starting positions.

In 2008, FIDE added Chess960 to an appendix of the Laws of Chess. The first world championship officially sanctioned by FIDE, the FIDE World Fischer Random Chess Championship 2019, brought additional prominence to the variant. It was won by Wesley So. In 2022, Hikaru Nakamura became the new champion.

Setup

Before the game, a starting position is randomly determined and set up, subject to certain requirements. White's pieces (not pawns) are placed randomly on the first , following two rules:
 The bishops must be placed on opposite-color squares.
 The king must be placed on a square between the rooks.

Black's pieces are placed equal-and-opposite to White's pieces. (For example, if the white king is randomly determined to start on f1, then the black king is placed on f8.) Pawns are placed on the players' second ranks as in classical chess.

After setup, the game is played the same as classical chess in all respects, with the exception of castling from the different possible starting positions for king and rooks.

Creating starting positions

There are 4 × 4 × 6 × 10 × 1 = 4 × 4 × 15 × 4 × 1 = 960
legal starting positions:
 4 light squares for one bishop;
 4 dark squares for the other bishop;
 6 remaining squares for the queen and 5! / (3! × 2!) = 5 × 4 / 2 = 10 ways to place the two (identical) knights on the remaining 5 squares,
 or, equivalently, 6! / (4! × 2!) = 5 × 6 / 2 = 15 ways to place the two (identical) knights on the remaining 6 squares and 4 remaining squares for the queen;
 1 way to place the two rooks and king on the remaining 3 squares, since the king must be between the rooks.

Usually, the players accept the conditions of the organizer to generate the starting position with software. If the software is not available or the players don't accept it, there are many ways to generate a random starting position with equal probability.

Select a number randomly in the appropriate range ; this number is then used as an index to the Fischer Random Chess numbering scheme.

In 1998, Ingo Althöfer proposed a method that requires only a single standard die. (Re-roll if needed to get values in the range 1–4 or 1–5).

960 choices can be obtained in several ways by combining polyhedral dice without re-rolling; for example 4×12×20 or 6×8×20 or 8×10×12.

Shuffling marked objects (cards, pieces, pawns, dominoes tiles, scrabble letters) and use the permutations. For example, shuffle 14 marked cards a,b,c,d,e,f,g,h, N,N,Q,R,R,R and place them, in this random order, separated into three rows:
 For the black squares (a,c,e,g); 
 For the white squares (b,d,f,h);

The first card of each row determines one bishop's place.

 The remaining cards Q,R,R,R,N,N place the queen, rooks and knights respectively in the remaining squares; the king must be between the rooks, so it takes the middle of the three 'R' squares.

Naming

The variant has held a number of different names. It was originally known as "Fischerandom" or "Fischerandom chess", the name given by Fischer. "Fischer random chess" is the official term, used by FIDE.

Hans-Walter Schmitt, chairman of the Frankfurt Chess Tigers e.V. and an advocate of the variant, started a brainstorming
process for creating a new name, which had to meet the requirements of leading grandmasters; specifically, the new name and its parts:
 should not contain part of the name of any grandmaster;
 should not include negatively biased or "spongy" elements (such as "random" or "freestyle"); and
 should be universally understood.
The effort culminated in the name choice "Chess960" – derived from the number of different possible starting positions. Fischer never publicly expressed an opinion on the name "Chess960".

Reinhard Scharnagl, another proponent of the variant, advocated the term "FullChess". Today he uses FullChess, however, to refer to variants which consistently embed classical chess (e.g. Chess960 and similar variants). He recommends the name Chess960 for the variant in preference to Fischer random chess.

Starting 2019, whenever the Saint Louis Chess Club hosts Fischer Random chess tournaments, their tournaments are called Chess 9LX, where '9LX' is a combination of the Arabic numeral 9 and the Roman numeral LX (60), a possible reference to how the number '960' is often read as 'nine-sixty' instead of 'nine hundred sixty' when talking about 'chess960'.

Castling rules
As in classical chess, each player may castle once per game, moving both the king and a rook in a single move; however, the castling rules were reinterpreted in Fischer random chess to support the different possible initial positions of king and rook. After castling, the final positions of king and rook are exactly the same as in classical chess, namely:

 After a-side castling (/long castling in classical chess), the king finishes on the c- and the a-side rook finishes on the d-file. The move is notated 0-0-0 as in classical chess.
 After h-side castling (/short castling in classical chess), the king finishes on the g-file and the h-side rook finishes on the f-file. The move is notated 0-0 as in classical chess.

Castling prerequisites are the same as in classical chess, namely:
 The king and the castling rook must not have previously moved. Note that if the king did not move while castling on a previous move (i.e. the king is on c1 or c8 already while castling a-side or on g1 or g8 already while castling h-side), it may be possible for this condition to still hold for castling on the other side. However, the FIDE rules explicitly state that castling may be done only once per game per player.
 No square from the king's initial square to its final square may be under attack by an enemy piece, even if the king is already on its final square.
 All the squares between the king's initial and final squares (including the final square), and all the squares between the castling rook's initial and final squares (including the final square), must be vacant except for the king and castling rook.

FIDE's recommended procedure for castling unambiguously is first to move the king outside the playing area next to its final square, then to move the rook to its final square, then to move the king to its final square. Another recommendation is to verbally announce the intent to castle before doing so.

Observations
 In some starting positions, squares can remain occupied during castling that would be required to be vacant under standard rules. Castling a-side (0-0-0) could still be possible despite the home rank a-, b-, or e-file squares being occupied, and similarly for the e- and h-files for h-side castling (0-0). In other positions, it can happen that the king or rook does not move during the castling maneuver since it already occupies its destination square – e.g., an h-side rook that starts on the f-file; in this case, only the king moves. No initial position allows a castling where neither piece moves, as the king must start between the rooks.
 Another unusual possibility is for castling to be available as the first move of the game, as happened in the 11th game of the tournament match between Hikaru Nakamura and Magnus Carlsen, Fischer Random Blitz 2018. The starting position had kings at f1/f8 and h-side rooks at g1/g8. Both players took the opportunity to castle on the first move (1.0-0 0-0).
 In standard chess, a rook can castle out of and through check but cannot castle into check because that would mean its king passes through check since, when castling, a king always passes its castling rook's destination square. However, in chess960, a rook can castle into check. This is discussed by Levon Aronian and Yasser Seirawan in Round 3 of St Louis' 2022 Chess 9LX tournament for move 18 of Aronian's game against Leinier Domínguez Pérez which had starting position RKBBNQNR.
 There are exactly 90 starting positions where, unlike in standard chess, players have to give up castling rights on one side in order to castle on the other side. This is seen by calculating that this happens 18 times in each of five possible groups of starting positions namely RKRXXXXX, RKXRXXXX, XRKRXXXX, XXXXXRKR and RXKRXXXX. In only these positions, a rook has to be moved (or captured) on one side in order to castle on the other side. For example, in the starting position RKRBBNNQ, which is in the first group RKRXXXXX, a player intending to castle a-side must first move the c-file rook (or let it be captured).
 The Sesse evaluations  (which used Stockfish 9) show that White has about, on average, a 7% increased advantage in these 90 positions (Evaluation is 0.1913) compared to the remaining 870 positions (Evaluation is 0.1790).

Theory

The study of openings in Fischer random chess is in its infancy, but fundamental opening principles still apply, including: protect the king, control the central squares (directly or indirectly), and develop rapidly, starting with the less valuable pieces.

Unprotected pawns may also need to be dealt with quickly. Many starting positions have unprotected pawns, and some starting positions have up to two that can be attacked on the first move. For example, in some Fischer random chess starting positions (see diagram), White can attack an unprotected black pawn on the first move, whereas in classical chess it takes two moves for White to attack, and there are no unprotected pawns.

White's advantage

It has been argued that two games should be played from each starting position, with players alternating colors, since the advantage offered to White in some initial positions may be greater than in classical chess.

However, Sesse  (which used Stockfish 9) evaluated the starting positions to be between 0.00 and 0.57 with an average of 0.18 pawns advantage for White where BBNNRKRQ (SP 80) was the most unbalanced position. The standard chess starting position (SP 518) was evaluated at 0.22. With a standard deviation of 0.0955, 923 starting positions lie within two standard deviations of the mean i.e. between 0 and 0.371. Hence, on average a Fischer Random starting position is 22.2% less unbalanced than the standard starting position.

Observations
 Since the King, Queen and Rooks all move sideways, only the 180 starting positions with none of these between a bishop and knight have no legal way to transpose into any other starting position. Of these, the majority of the 120 starting positions with BBNN, NNBB will leave a pawn unprotected.
 Any starting position where one knight is not adjacent to the King or Queen or a Bishop will leave a pawn unprotected. Most such starting positions which exist among the 780 which have a legal way to transpose into any other starting position will have the two knights adjacent, with either one or both rooks between them and the other pieces. However, three of these are the traditional starting position (SP 518) with a knight transposed onto the rim.

History

Fischer random chess is a variant of shuffle chess, which had been suggested as early as 1792 with games played as early as 1842.

Fischer's modification "imposes certain restrictions, arguably an improvement on the anarchy of the fully randomized game in which one player is almost certain to start at an advantage". Fischer started to develop his new version of chess after the 1992 return match with Boris Spassky. The result was the formulation of the rules of Fischer random chess in September 1993, introduced formally to the public on June 19, 1996, in Buenos Aires, Argentina. 

Fischer's goal was to eliminate what he considered the complete dominance of openings preparation in classical chess, replacing it with creativity and talent. In a situation where the starting position was random it would be impossible to fix every move of the game. Since the "opening book" for 960 possible opening systems would be too difficult to devote to memory, the players must create every move originally. From the first move, both players must devise original strategies and cannot use well-established patterns. Fischer believed that eliminating memorized book moves would level the playing field.

During the summer of 1993, Bobby Fischer visited László Polgár and his family in Hungary. All of the Polgar sisters (Judit Polgár, Susan Polgar, and Sofia Polgar) played many games of Fischer random chess with Fischer. At one point Sofia beat Fischer three games in a row.  Fischer was not pleased when the father, László, showed Fischer an old chess book that described what appeared to be a forerunner of Fischer random chess.  The book was written by Izidor Gross and published in 1910. Fischer then changed the rules of his variation in order to make it different. There are games of shuffle chess recorded as early as 1852 but Fischer is generally credited with fixing the colors of bishops alongside king placement between the rooks and defining the castling process. In a later radio interview, Fischer explained his reasoning for proposing a revision of shuffle chess, rather than a game with new pieces (and a larger board), as the “new chess“:

Tournaments
 1996 – The first Fischer random chess tournament was held in Vojvodina, Yugoslavia, in the spring of 1996, and was won by International Grandmaster (GM) Péter Lékó with 9½/11, ahead of GM Stanimir Nikolić with 9 points.
 2006–present – The first Fischer Random Championships of the Netherlands was held by Fischer Z chess club and has since been held annually. GM Dimitri Reinderman has won this title for three years, champion in 2010, 2014, and 2015. Two grandmasters have won the title twice, GM Yasser Seirawan and Dutch GM Dennis de Vreugt.
 2010 – In 2010 the US Chess Federation sponsored its first Chess960 tournament, at the Jerry Hanken Memorial US Open tournament in Irvine, California. This one-day event, directed by Damian Nash, saw a first-place tie between GM Larry Kaufman and FM Mark Duckworth, which Kaufman won on tiebreaks.
 2012 – The British Chess960 Championship was held at the Mind Sports Olympiad, won by Ankush Khandelwal.
 2018 – The first edition of the European Fischer Random Cup was held in Reykjavik on March 9, 2018, on Fischer's 75th birthday. It was won by Aleksandr Lenderman.
 2019 – The Icelandic Chess Federation organized the European Fischer Random Championship on the rest day of 34th edition of The GAMMA Reykjavik Open on April 12, 2019. The tournament was won by the then 15-year-old Iranian prodigy Alireza Firouzja, a full point ahead of US's Andrew Tang, who was second on tiebreaks.

Mainz Championships

Note: None of the Mainz championships were recognized by FIDE. Furthermore, they were all played with rapid time controls.
 2001 – In 2001, Lékó became the first Fischer random chess world champion, defeating GM Michael Adams in an eight-game match played as part of the Mainz Chess Classic. There were no qualifying matches (also true of the first classical chess world chess champion titleholders), but both players were in the top five in the January 2001 world rankings for classical chess. Lékó was chosen because of the many novelties he has introduced to known chess theories, as well as his previous tournament win; in addition, Lékó has supposedly played Fischer random chess games with Fischer himself. Adams was chosen because he was the world number one in blitz (rapid) chess and is regarded as an extremely strong player in unfamiliar positions. The match was won by a narrow margin, 4½ to 3½.
 2002 – In 2002 at Mainz, an open tournament was held which was attended by 131 players, with Peter Svidler taking first place. Fischer random chess was selected as the April 2002 "Recognized Variant of the Month" by The Chess Variant Pages (ChessVariants.org). The book Shall We Play Fischerandom Chess? was published in 2002, authored by Yugoslavian GM Svetozar Gligorić.
 2003 – At the 2003 Mainz Chess Classic, Svidler beat Lékó in an eight-game match for the World Championship title by a score of 4½–3½. The Chess960 open tournament drew 179 players, including 50 GMs.  It was won by Levon Aronian, the 2002 World Junior Champion. Svidler is the official first World New Chess Association (WNCA) world champion inaugurated on August 14, 2003, with Jens Beutel, Mayor of Mainz as the President and Hans-Walter Schmitt, Chess Classic organiser as Secretary. The WNCA maintains an own dedicated Chess960 rating list.
 2004 – Aronian played Svidler for the title at the 2004 Mainz Chess Classic, losing 4½–3½. At the same tournament in 2004, Aronian played two Chess960 games against the Dutch computer chess program The Baron, developed by Richard Pijl. Both games ended in a draw. It was the first ever man against machine match in Chess960. Zoltán Almási won the Chess960 open tournament in 2004.

 2005 – Almási and Svidler played an eight-game match at the 2005 Mainz Chess Classic. Once again, Svidler defended his title, winning 5–3. Levon Aronian won the Chess960 open tournament in 2005. During the Chess Classic 2005 in Mainz, initiated by Mark Vogelgesang and Eric van Reem, the first-ever Chess960 computer chess world championship was played. Nineteen programs, including the powerful Shredder, played in this tournament. As a result of this tournament, Spike became the first Chess960 computer world champion.
 2006 – The 2006 Mainz Chess Classic saw Svidler defending his championship in a rematch against Levon Aronian. This time, Aronian won the match 5–3 to become the third ever Fischer random chess world champion. Étienne Bacrot won the Chess960 open tournament, earning him a title match against Aronian in 2007. Three new Chess960 world championship matches were held, in the women, junior and senior categories. In the women category, Alexandra Kosteniuk became the first Chess960 Women World Champion by beating Elisabeth Pähtz 5½ to 2½. The 2006 Senior Chess960 World Champion was Vlastimil Hort, and the 2006 Junior Chess960 World Champion was Pentala Harikrishna. Shredder won the computer championship, making it Chess960 computer world champion 2006.
 2007 – In 2007 Mainz Chess Classic Aronian successfully defended his title of Chess960 World Champion over Viswanathan Anand, while Victor Bologan won the Chess960 open tournament. Rybka won the 2007 computer championship.
 2008 – Hikaru Nakamura won the 2008 Finet Chess960 Open (Mainz). 
 2009 – The last Mainz tournament was held in 2009. Hikaru Nakamura won the Chess960 World Championship against Aronian, while Alexander Grischuk won the Chess960 open tournament.

Computers
In 2005, chess program The Baron played two Fischer random chess games against Chess960 World Champion Peter Svidler, who won 1½–½. The chess program Shredder, developed by Stefan Meyer-Kahlen of Germany, played two games against Zoltán Almási from Hungary, where Shredder won 2–0.

TCEC has held TCEC FRC since 2019 where Stockfish has won every edition except the 2021 edition which was won by Komodo.

Miscellaneous Matches

From February 9 to 13, 2018, a Fischer random chess match between reigning classical World Chess Champion Magnus Carlsen and the unofficial Fischer random chess world champion Hikaru Nakamura was held in Høvikodden, Norway. The match consisted of 8 rapid and 8 blitz games, with the rapid games counting double. Each position was used in two games, with colors reversed. Carlsen prevailed with a score of 14–10.

Saint Louis Chess Club's Champions Showdown: Chess 9LX

2018 – From September 11 to 14, 2018, the Saint Louis Chess Club held a Fischer random chess event, but they did not yet call their event 'Chess 9LX'. (They started next year.) The playing format consisted of individual matches, each pair of players facing the same five different starting positions, with 6 rapid games (counting 2 points each) and 14 blitz games (counting 1 point each). The players and scores: 

 Veselin Topalov (14½–11½) defeated Garry Kasparov.
 Hikaru Nakamura (14–12) defeated Peter Svidler.
 Wesley So (14½–11½) defeated Anish Giri.
 Maxime Vachier-Lagrave (17½–8½) defeated Sam Shankland.
 Levon Aronian (17½–8½) defeated Leinier Domínguez.

2019 – The playing format once again consisted of individual matches. The players and scores: 

 Fabiano Caruana (19-7) defeated Garry Kasparov.
 Wesley So (18–8) defeated Veselin Topalov.
 Peter Svidler (15½–10½) defeated Leinier Domínguez Pérez.
 Hikaru Nakamura (14½–11½) defeated Levon Aronian.

2020 – The playing format changed to a round robin. The event was won by both (There was no tiebreaker) reigning world (standard) chess champion Magnus Carlsen and Hikaru Nakamura. The reigning FIDE world Fischer random chess champion Wesley So placed fifth out of the ten players. So lost only once, namely to Alireza Firouzja.

2021 – The playing format was once again a round robin. The event was won by Leinier Domínguez Pérez. The reigning FIDE world Fischer random chess champion Wesley So placed second out of the ten players, tied with Sam Shankland and Maxime Vachier-Lagrave. So lost only twice, namely to Leinier Domínguez Pérez and Sam Shankland.

2022 – The playing format was once again a round robin. The event was won by Fabiano Caruana who defeated Alireza Firouzja in armageddon. Firouzja had previously placed tenth out of ten (last place) in the 2020 tournament. The reigning FIDE world Fischer random chess champion Wesley So placed fifth out of the ten players. So lost only thrice, namely to Shakhriyar Mamedyarov, Alireza Firouzja (again) and Caruana.

FIDE World Championship

On April 20, 2019, the first world championship in Fischer random chess officially recognized by FIDE was announced. It ended on November 2, 2019. In the finals, Wesley So defeated the reigning and four-time world chess champion Magnus Carlsen 13½–2½ (4 wins, 0 losses, 2 draws) to become the inaugural world Fischer random chess champion.

In the announcement, FIDE president Arkady Dvorkovich commented: It is an unprecedented move that the International Chess Federation recognizes a new variety of chess, so this was a decision that required to be carefully thought out. But we believe that Fischer Random is a positive innovation: It injects new energies and enthusiasm into our game, but at the same time it doesn't mean a rupture with our classical chess and its tradition. It is probably for this reason that Fischer Random chess has won the favor of the chess community, including the top players and the world champion himself. FIDE couldn't be oblivious to that: It was time to embrace and incorporate this modality of chess.

On August 19, 2022, the second world championship was announced for later in 2022, in Iceland. This is exactly half a century after the World Chess Championship 1972 held in Iceland between Fischer and Boris Spassky. On October 30, Hikaru Nakamura won the finals by defeating Ian Nepomniachtchi who had earlier knocked out Magnus Carlsen, in the armageddon after drawing the match 2-2 (+1-1=2).

Coding games and positions

Recorded games must convey the Fischer random chess starting position.  Games recorded using the Portable Game Notation (PGN) can record the initial position using Forsyth–Edwards Notation (FEN), as the value of the "FEN" tag.  Castling is notated the same as in classical chess (except PGN requires letter O not number 0). Note that not all chess programs can handle castling correctly in Fischer random chess games. To correctly record a Fischer random chess game in PGN, an additional "Variant" tag (not "Variation" tag, which has a different meaning) must be used to identify the rules; the rule named "Fischerandom" is accepted by many chess programs as identifying Fischer random chess, though "Chess960" should be accepted as well. This means that in a PGN-recorded game, one of the PGN tags (after the initial seven tags) would look like this: [Variant "Fischerandom"].

FEN is capable of expressing all possible starting positions of Fischer random chess; however, unmodified FEN cannot express all possible positions of a Chess960 game.  In a game, a rook may move into the back row on the same side of the king as the other rook, or pawn(s) may be underpromoted into rook(s) and moved into the back row.  If a rook is unmoved and can still castle, yet there is more than one rook on that side, FEN notation as traditionally interpreted is ambiguous.  This is because FEN records that castling is possible on that side, but not which rook is still allowed to castle.

A modification of FEN, X-FEN, has been devised by Reinhard Scharnagl to remove this ambiguity. In X-FEN, the castling markings "KQkq" have their expected meanings: "Q" and "q" mean a-side castling is still legal (for White and Black respectively), and "K" and "k" mean h-side castling is still legal (for White and Black respectively).  However, if there is more than one rook on the baseline on the same side of the king, and the rook that can castle is not the outermost rook on that side, then the file letter (uppercase for White) of the rook that can castle is used instead of "K", "k", "Q", or "q"; in X-FEN notation, castling potentials belong to the outermost rooks by default. The maximum length of the castling value is still four characters.  X-FEN is upwardly compatible with FEN, that is, a program supporting X-FEN will automatically use the normal FEN codes for a traditional chess starting position without requiring any special programming. As a benefit all 18 pseudo FRC positions (positions with traditional placements of rooks and king) still remain uniquely encoded.

The solution implemented by chess engines like Shredder and Fritz is to use the letters of the columns on which the rooks began the game.  This scheme is sometimes called Shredder-FEN. For the traditional setup, Shredder-FEN would use HAha instead of KQkq.

Similar variants

There are several variants based on randomization of the initial setup. "Randomized Chess, in one or other of its many reincarnations, continues to attract support even, or perhaps especially, that of top players."

Remarks

Any variant with N starting positions can exist with mirroring white and black otherwise it means an other (double) variant with NxN starting positions. In any variant the castling is not possible in any case or is possible only when king and rook are on their traditional starting squares, or as follows:

After castling with the nearest rook to the column:

 "h", the king will be in column "g" and the rook will be in column "f".
 "a", the king will be in column "c" and the rook will be in column "d".

The double chess2880 without castling it is known as Transcendental chess (or TC).

Chess18 is the subset of Chess960 in which the kings and rooks are fixed. Chess 324 is the subset of double chess960 that is equivalent to double chess18.

As discussed above in 'Castling rules', Chess870 and Chess90 are the partitioning subsets of Chess960 in which a player, respectively, never needs or may need to give up castling rights on one side to castle on the other side.

Chess480

In "Castling in Chess960: An appeal for simplicity", John Kipling Lewis proposes alternative castling rules which Lewis has named "Orthodoxed Castling".

The preconditions for castling are the same as in Chess960, but when castling,
... the king is transferred from its original square two squares towards (or over) the rook, then that rook is transferred to the square the king has just crossed (if it is not already there). If the king and rook are adjacent in a corner and the king cannot move two spaces over the rook, then the king and rook exchange squares.

Unlike Fischer random chess, the final position after castling in Chess480 will usually not be the same as the final position of a castling move in traditional chess.  Lewis argues that this alternative better conforms to how the castling move was historically developed.

Lewis has named this chess variation "Chess480"; it follows the rules of Chess960 with the exception of the castling rules. Although a Chess480 game can start with any of 960 starting positions, the castling rules are symmetrical (whereas the Chess960 castling rules are not), so that mirror-image positions have identical strategies; thus there are only 480 effectively different positions. The number of starting positions could be reduced to 480 without losing any possibilities, for example by requiring the white king to start on a light (or dark) square.

There are other claims to the nomenclature "Chess480"; Reinhard Scharnagl defines it as the white queen is always to the left of the white king.

David O'Shaughnessy argues in "Castling in Chess480: An appeal for sanity" that the Chess480 rules are often not useful from a gameplay perspective. In about 66% of starting positions, players have the options of castling deeper into the wing the king started on, or castling into the center of the board (when the king starts on the b-, c-, f-, or g-files). From Wikipedia article Castling: "Castling is an important goal in the early part of a game, because it serves two valuable purposes: it moves the king into a safer position away from the center of the board, and it moves the rook to a more active position in the center of the board." An example of poor castling options is a position where the kings start on g1 and g8 respectively. These "problem positions" play well with Chess960 castling rules.

Non-random setups

The initial setup need not necessarily be random. 
The players or a tournament setting may decide on a specific position in advance, for example.  Tournament Directors prefer that all boards in a single round play the same random position, as to maintain order and abbreviate the setup time for each round.

Starting with Black, the players, in turn, place one of eight pieces on White's back rank, where it must stay. The only restriction is that the bishops must go on opposite-color squares. There will be a vacant square of the required color for the second bishop, no matter where the previous pieces have been placed. Some variety could be introduced into this process by allowing each player to exercise a one-time option of moving a piece already on the board instead of putting a new piece on the board.
Once the bishops are on opposite-color squares, if the king is not between the rooks, it should trade places with the nearest rook.

Without some limitation on which pieces go on the board first, it is possible to reach impasse positions, which cannot be completed to legal Fischer random chess starting positions.

When the empty squares of one color are two and the corresponding bishop has not been placed yet and another piece is placed in one of the empty squares of that color, then the position of the bishop is determined. That's why, it is more correct to place the bishop when the empty squares of a color remain at four or three.

The Black places first because the placement of the 7th piece by him determines the position of the 8th piece. In that way, the Black places in 5 positions and seeks the best defense, and the White places in three positions and plays first.

In order for the players to share the squares equally and legal starting position setup, they have to choose alternately from the 8 pieces. Then each player places on a white square and on a black square.
When all pieces are setup, if the king must be placed between the two rooks, then it is swapped with the nearest rook.
In this case, the Black decides who chooses and who places first.

A chess clock could even be used during this phase as well as during normal play.

References

Bibliography

Further reading

External links
 The birth of Fischer Random Chess by Eric van Reem, The Chess Variant Pages
 CCRL 404FRC Computer Chess Rating List for FRC 40/4 time control
 Chess Book from Castle Long publisher information on book by Gene Milener
 Chess960.net Chess960 information: Why, how, what, where
 Fischer Describes his Fischer Random Chess Rules audio clip of Bobby Fischer
 Fischer Random Chess various authors, The Chess Variant Pages
 Lichess free online Chess960 play against an engine or human
 Chess 960 playable online at Green Chess
 Chess960 generator
 chessgames.com's Fischerandom chess generator
 Chess960 Start Positions
 Fischer describes the rules here.

 
Bobby Fischer
Chess variants
1996 in chess
Board games introduced in 1996